Roselee Jencke  is a former Australia netball international and netball coach. As a player, Jencke was a member of the Australia teams that won the gold medal at the 1991 World Netball Championships and the silver medals at the 1985 World Games and the 1987 World Netball Championships. In 1992 she was awarded the Medal of the Order of Australia. Between 2009 and 2020, Jencke served as head coach of Queensland Firebirds. Between 2011 and  2016 she guided Firebirds to five ANZ Championship grand finals, winning three premierships in 2011, 2015 and 2016.

Early life, education and family
Jencke is originally from Pakenham, Victoria. She is the daughter of Norman and Janet Jencke. Her younger brother, Ray Jencke, is a former Australian rules footballer. She attended Pakenham Secondary College. She is married to Paul Gardner. Her daughter, Macy Gardner, is also a netball player and made her Suncorp Super Netball debut for Queensland Firebirds in 2019.

Playing career

AIS
Between 1982 and 1983 Jencke played for the Australian Institute of Sport where she was coached by Wilma Shakespear and Gaye Teede.

Esso/Mobil Superleague
During the Esso/Mobil Superleague era, Jencke played for Melbourne City and Melbourne Pumas. In 1990 she played for Melbourne City, a composite team coached by Norma Plummer that also featured Simone McKinnis and Shelley O'Donnell. Melbourne City finished as champions after defeating Adelaide Contax 52–42 in the grand final. In 1993 Jencke captained a Melbourne Pumas team with McKinnis as vice-captain and with Norma Plummer as coach. Jencke was still a member of the Pumas squad in 1996.

Australia
Between 1985 and 1992 Jencke made 43 senior Test appearances for Australia. In 1984 she had captained the Australia under-21 team. She made her senior debut on 1 February 1985 against New Zealand. She was subsequently a member of the Australia teams that won the silver medals at the 1985 World Games and the 1987 World Netball Championships. Jencke was also a prominent member of the Australia team that won the gold medal at the 1991 World Netball Championships. In the final she made a match-saving intercept in the final minute to ensure a one-goal victory for Australia. Chronic back pain forced her to retire from the national team in 1993. In 1992 Jencke, along with the rest of the gold medal winning squad, was awarded the Medal of the Order of Australia.

Coaching career

Assistant coach
Club level
After a back injury kept her sidelined for much of the 1997 Commonwealth Bank Trophy season with Melbourne Kestrels, Lisa Alexander employed Jencke as an assistant coach. In 2000 she also served as an assistant coach with Melbourne Phoenix. In 2005 she also served as an assistant coach with AIS Canberra Darters.

Australia
Jencke has also been a selector, assistant coach and specialist coach with Australia. She served as an assistant coach with the Australia under-21 team that won a bronze medal at the 2005 World Youth Netball Championships. She was also an assistant coach with the 2007 senior squad. Between 2015 and 2018 she served as Lisa Alexander's assistant/defensive specialist.

Queensland Firebirds
In 2009 Jencke was appointed head coach of Queensland Firebirds. Between 2011 and  2016 she guided Firebirds to five ANZ Championship grand finals and three premierships.
At the end of the 2020 Suncorp Super Netball season, Jencke announced she was stepping down as Firebirds head coach.

Honours

Player
Australia
World Netball Championships
Winners: 1991
Runners Up: 1987
World Games
Runners Up: 1985
Melbourne City
Esso Super League
Winners: 1990

Coach
Queensland Firebirds
ANZ Championship
Winners: 2011, 2015, 2016
Runners Up: 2013, 2014

Individual awards

References

Living people
Australian netball players
Netball players from Victoria (Australia)
Australia international netball players
Netball players at the 1985 World Games
Australian Institute of Sport netball players
Australian Institute of Sport netball coaches
Queensland Firebirds coaches
ANZ Championship coaches
Suncorp Super Netball coaches
Australian netball coaches
Recipients of the Medal of the Order of Australia
Esso/Mobil Superleague players
Year of birth missing (living people)
1987 World Netball Championships players
1991 World Netball Championships players